Robert McCulloch may refer to:

 Robert McCulloch (priest) (born 1946), Australian clergyman
 Robert P. McCulloch (1911–1977), American entrepreneur
 Bob McCulloch (prosecutor) (born 1951), American lawyer

See also
 Robert McCullough (disambiguation)